The Waspo 98 Hannover  is a swimming and water polo club in Hannover, Germany. The club was founded in 2003 by the fusion of the former German champions Waspo Hannover-Linden 1913 and Wasserfreunde 98 Hannover.

Bibliography 
Wolfgang Philipps: Vergangenheit und Zukunft. 100 Jahre Waspo Hannover-Linden. 1913 – 2013, Hannover 2013

References 

Water polo clubs in Germany